Neamine (neomycin A) is a degradation product of the aminoglycoside antibiotic neomycin.

References

Further reading 
 

Aminoglycoside antibiotics